Jiří Lenko (born 29 April 1985) is a Czech former professional football player. Lenko played mostly as a left-sided defender.

Career
Lenko started his career at Austrian team Rapid Wien, where he played from 2003 to 2005. He then joined Kapfenberger SV, where he spent almost one years, before moving to FC Zbrojovka Brno in his country. He joined Austrian club FC Superfund early in June 2007. From June 2008 played in Bulgarian club Lokomotiv Mezdra.

External links
 

1985 births
Living people
Czech footballers
FC Zbrojovka Brno players
SK Rapid Wien players
PFC Lokomotiv Mezdra players
Kapfenberger SV players
First Vienna FC players
SC Wiener Neustadt players
Association football defenders